Harry Lane (1855–1917) was an American politician.

Harry Lane may also refer to:

 Harry Lane (footballer, born 1894) (1894–?), English footballer
 Harry Lane (footballer, born 1909) (1909–1977), English footballer
 Sir Philip Lane (police officer) (Harry Philip Parnell Lane, 1870–1927), British police officer

See also
Harold Lane (disambiguation)
Henry Lane (disambiguation)